Mihály Martos (born 1 February 1945) is a Hungarian speed skater. He competed in 500 meters and 1500 meters men's speed skating at the 1964 Winter Olympics and the 1968 Winter Olympics.

References

1945 births
Living people
Hungarian male speed skaters
Olympic speed skaters of Hungary
Speed skaters at the 1964 Winter Olympics
Speed skaters at the 1968 Winter Olympics
Speed skaters from Budapest